Rosslyn is a heavily urbanized unincorporated area in Northern Virginia located in the northeastern corner of Arlington County, Virginia, north of Arlington National Cemetery and directly across the Potomac River from Georgetown and Foggy Bottom in Washington, D.C.

Rosslyn encompasses the Arlington neighborhoods of North Rosslyn and Radnor/Ft. Myer Heights, and is located east of Court House, another urbanized Arlington neighborhood. Characterized as one of several "urban villages" by the county, the numerous skyscrapers in the dense business section of Rosslyn make its appearance in some ways more urban than nearby Washington. Rosslyn residents have an average household income of $105,000 and 81% are college graduates.

Establishments in the neighborhood include Sinclair Broadcast Group-owned ABC affiliate WJLA located in the Rosslyn Twin Towers, and Marriott International's longest operating hotel, the Key Bridge Marriott. Notable structures include the United States Marine Corps War Memorial, and the Netherlands Carillon and Freedom Park offer views of the Washington Monument and other Washington landmarks.

History 

In Virginia's colonial period, Rosslyn's shoreline contained a landing for Awbrey's ferry, which transported travelers to and from Georgetown. A community that gradually developed behind the shore became known as Ross Lynn, the name of a local farm owned by William and Carolyn Ross. During the 1830s and 1840s, the Aqueduct Bridge was constructed between Georgetown and Rosslyn.  When completed in 1843, this bridge carried the Alexandria Canal, which transported canal boats from the Chesapeake and Ohio Canal in Georgetown to the downstream port of Alexandria, Virginia.

Following the American Civil War in the 1860s, a lawless community developed at the base of the bridge. Known primarily for its gambling halls, pawnshops, saloons, brothels and unsavory inhabitants, the community failed to attract much development other than the Arlington Brewery, which became a Cherry Smash soft drink bottling plant after Prohibition went into effect. Eventually, spurred by the real estate potential that the arrival of electric trolleys in the 1890s inspired, developers and reformers ousted Rosslyn's more unsavory elements in the early 20th century. They organized under the name "Good Citizen's League" and nominated Captain Crandal Mackey as the Commonwealth's Attorney to fight corruption. Mackey, after being unsuccessfully challenged by the incumbent on legal grounds, won the election by two votes. When the sheriff did not execute Mackey's orders to clean up in Rosslyn, Mackey organized a group of thirty citizens to raid and destroy the saloons and gambling houses. This expedition took place of 30 May 1904.

The area around Rosslyn remained dangerous, especially at night on the Falls Church Turnpike (now U.S. Route 29, Lee Highway). A short way past Rosslyn heading west was Dead Man's Hollow, near today's intersection with Spout Run. The name came from the occasional gruesome murders as the result of robberies.

Nevertheless, Rosslyn remained primarily known for its pawnshops and used car dealerships for many years. The Aqueduct Bridge connecting Rosslyn to Georgetown was replaced by the Francis Scott Key Memorial Bridge in 1923.

In 1964, the Theodore Roosevelt Bridge opened to carry Interstate 66 (I-66) between Washington, D.C., and Rosslyn.  Soon afterwards, a development boom in the 1960s began to revitalize Rosslyn with the construction of a large number of high-rise office buildings and hotels in its center and a smaller number of residential buildings on its outskirts. Arlington County widened Rosslyn's major streets to accommodate the increased motor vehicle traffic that this new development would bring. A skywalk system carried pedestrian traffic over these widened streets. While planners expected retail establishments to develop along the skywalks, few such establishments actually opened.  As a result, the skywalk system attracted few pedestrians. The Arlington County government has since announced plans to dismantle some or all of the bridges that carry the skywalks over Rosslyn's broad streets.

During the Watergate scandal of the early 1970s, "Deep Throat" (W. Mark Felt) passed information to Washington Post reporter Bob Woodward in the middle of the night in an underground parking garage at 1401 Wilson Boulevard in Rosslyn.

In 1977, Metrorail's Blue Line reached Rosslyn. In subsequent years, the Blue Line and the Orange Line were extended from an underground junction near the Rosslyn station to serve Northern Virginia's suburbs. In the early 1980s, I-66 was extended through Rosslyn to reach the Capital Beltway. The extensions of Metrorail and I-66 attracted additional high-rise development to Rosslyn.

In 2003, the Virginia Baseball Stadium Authority attempted to attract the relocating Montréal Expos to Northern Virginia by proposing three Arlington County locations for a new baseball stadium. Two sites were in the urban village of Pentagon City; the third was a site in the southeastern corner of Rosslyn that was already occupied by four cooperative buildings, formerly the historic Arlington Towers, which were the first high-rise towers in Arlington County, now known as River Place. The issue proved highly divisive, and Virginia's bid failed when Virginia Governor Mark Warner ruled out state financing for stadium construction. The Expos moved to D.C. after the 2004 season to become the Washington Nationals, with a new stadium built in southeast Washington.

In 2013, the Georgetown Business Improvement District proposed a gondola lift between Georgetown and Rosslyn as an alternative to placing a Metro stop at Georgetown in its 2013-2028 economic plans. Washington, D.C and Arlington County have been conducting feasibility studies for it since 2016.

Economy

The original corporate headquarters of the USA Today newspaper, owned by the Gannett Company, was located in Rosslyn. Both the company and the newspaper occupied two high-rise silver-colored towers, built in the early 1980s, which adjoin each other at 1000 and 1100 Wilson Boulevard. Gannett did not own these buildings, and moved from their original home to a new campus in Fairfax County, Virginia, in 2002. In the same year, the ABC-affiliate for Washington, D.C., (WJLA-TV, "ABC 7") moved their main studios into the space in Rosslyn previously occupied by USA Today.

Federal agencies based in Rosslyn include the Trade and Development Agency, the Bureau of Overseas Buildings Operations, the Bureau of Conflict and Stabilization Operations, and the Bureau of Diplomatic Security. The Department of State has several office locations in Rosslyn.

Nonprofits based in Rosslyn include the American Institute in Taiwan.

As of 2010, Rosslyn has  of office space and 6,365 housing units. Some of the tallest condominium buildings in the Washington metropolitan area are located in Rosslyn, including Waterview tower, River Place, and Turnberry tower.

Construction of 1812 N Moore in Rosslyn began in 2010, and in late 2013 it became the tallest building in the Washington metropolitan area. In 2017, the international food and beverage company Nestlé S.A. announced that it would move its U.S. corporate headquarters from California to this building.

In order to make the area more walkable, Rosslyn's elevated walkways and other urban peculiarities are planned to be demolished or modified, along with lanes being removed or reversed.

Arts and culture

Annual cultural events
The Arlington County Government operates the 367-seat Rosslyn Spectrum Theater. Five annual film festivals are held in Rosslyn. The Washington DC Independent Film Festival runs for nearly two weeks in March showing independent films from around the world in various locations in and around Washington, DC. In 2011 Rosslyn hosted over 30 film screenings as well as classes, seminars and workshops led by industry professionals.
The Annual NoVa International Jewish Film Festival is held each spring in Rosslyn and other Virginia locations. The Rosslyn Outdoor Film Festival runs in the spring and summer months showing popular films for free in Gateway Park Friday evenings at dusk. Slapsticon is a four-day film festival in July that features silent films, occasionally accompanied by live musicians, as well as early films with audio tracks. The Rosebud Film & Video Festival is an all day event in November that features original works by regional film and video makers. The Rosslyn Jazz Festival, started in 1991, attracted 10,000 attendees in 2006. The annual US FreedomWalk Festival, started in 2000, draws walkers from around the world each Fall for a weekend of walks in Rosslyn and nearby areas.

Education
The Art Institute of Washington is located at North Fort Myer Drive. Rosslyn is a location for some of the University of Virginia's business programs, including McIntire School of Commerce Master of Science in the Management of Information Technology at the Waterview Conference Center, and Darden School of Business Master of Business Administration (Executive/Global Executive) at the Rosslyn Twin Towers.

Museums and other points of interest
The Marine Corps War Memorial in Rosslyn is visited by over 1 million annually. Among these visitors are audiences for the Sunset Parades performed Tuesday evenings during the summer months by the United States Marine Drum and Bugle Corps with the Marine Corps Silent Drill Platoon. Crowds also gather at the Memorial on the 4th of July to watch the national fireworks display.

The Netherlands Carillon in Rosslyn is a set of 50 bells housed in a 12-story tower between Arlington National Cemetery and the Marine Corps War Memorial. The carillon is a gift from the Netherlands to the US in recognition of support received during World War II. Originally installed with 49 bells, a 50th was added by the Netherlands in 1995 on the 50th anniversary of the liberation of the Netherlands. Each spring the grounds are planted with thousands of tulips imported from the Netherlands. During the summer months carilloneurs play concerts on the bells using a keyboard located in the tower. The tower is occasionally open to the public and offers views of the national monuments in Washington, DC, the Marine Corps War Memorial, and Arlington National Cemetery.

Infrastructure

Transportation

Rosslyn is a transportation hub for the subway and highway systems. It contains the intersection of U.S. Route 29 (Frances Scott Key Bridge and Lee Highway), Virginia State Route 110 (Richmond Highway), the George Washington Memorial Parkway, and I-66 (Custis Memorial Parkway). U.S. Route 50 (Arlington Boulevard) connects with all of these routes in and near Rosslyn. Washington Metro's Blue, Orange, and Silver Lines service the Rosslyn Metro station.

There are 14 Metrobus lines to the urban village. There is a shuttle run by Georgetown University. A DC Circulator route connects Rosslyn with Georgetown and Dupont Circle in Washington, D.C. There are 2 private bus companies that provide service between the Rosslyn Metro Station and New York City. Vamoose Bus provides daily service from 1801 N Lynn Street in Rosslyn to Penn Station/Madison Square Garden in Midtown Manhattan in New York City. Tripper Bus provides daily service from 1901 N. Moore Street to the Macy's flagship store on 34th Street in New York City.

Trails

Multiple cycling and pedestrian trails are present in Rosslyn, connecting Northern Virginia and Washington, D.C. The paved Custis Trail travels through Rosslyn along Interstate 66. By traveling southeast on the Custis Trail and crossing the George Washington Memorial Parkway, one can reach the paved Mount Vernon Trail, which travels downstream on the Virginia side of the Potomac River to Alexandria and Mount Vernon, as well as the unpaved Potomac Heritage Trail, which travels upstream near the riverbank to the Capital Beltway. By heading west along the Custis Trail, one can reach the Washington and Old Dominion Railroad Trail, which travels for  through Northern Virginia. One can also cross the Francis Scott Key Bridge at the end of Lynn Street and pick up the unpaved C&O Canal towpath or the paved Capital Crescent Trail in Washington. By heading south on North Lynn Street, one can cross over U.S. Route 50 and travel through the grounds of the Marine Corps War Memorial to reach a paved trail that travels along the wall of Arlington National Cemetery to Memorial Drive. A sidewalk and paved path along the Drive connects in Lady Bird Johnson Park on Columbia Island to the Mount Vernon Trail and to the wide sidewalk of the Arlington Memorial Bridge, which crosses the Potomac into Washington.

In popular culture

The following media feature Rosslyn in some way, usually by showing its distinctive skyline.

Movies
 All the President's Men (1976)
 Minority Report (2002)
 Mission: Impossible III (2006)
 Transformers: Revenge of the Fallen (2009)
 Captain America: The Winter Soldier (2014)

Television
 The West Wing (1999–2006)
 Bones (2005–2017)
 House of Cards (2013–2018)
 The Walking Dead (2016)

Music
 Rosslyn Mountain Boys (1977)

References

Further reading 
 Jackman, Tom (2013). Arlington garage where ‘Deep Throat’ spilled secrets is marked for demolition. The Washington Post
  A history of Rosslyn.

External links 

 Rosslyn Metro Station Area Data, Statistics and Development Profile 
 Arlington's Urban Villages - Rosslyn
 Rosslyn: Discover a New Horizon
 
 Rosslyn walking map and guide
 Urban Arlington County
 Discover Rosslyn: Restaurants, Shopping and Living
 Rosslyn City: the Brooklyn of Washington City - 1889 advertisement from The Washington Post

Neighborhoods in Arlington County, Virginia
Transit-oriented developments in the United States
Edge cities in the Baltimore-Washington metropolitan area